Hartmut Neugebauer (2 September 1942 – 22 June 2017) was a German actor, voice actor and dialogue director.

He was the German dub-over voice of actors Gene Hackman, John Goodman and Robbie Coltrane. He was the father of the late voice actress Veronika Neugebauer (1968–2009).

Selected filmography

Film 
  (1968) – Hans-Jürgen Hoffmann
 The Stuff That Dreams Are Made Of (1972) – Drunken Visitor at Reeperbahn Brothel (voice, uncredited)
 Liebe durch die Autotür (1972) – Scheich (voice, uncredited)
 Laß jucken Kumpel 2. Teil: Das Bullenkloster (1973) – Fahrer (uncredited)
 Die Stoßburg (1974) – Kochen
 Charley's Nieces (1974) – Knall
 Champagner aus dem Knobelbecher (1975) – Hartmann
 Mein Onkel Theodor oder Wie man viel Geld im Schlaf verdient (1975) – Mann am Fenster (uncredited)
 Albino (1976) – Sergeant Major Sam (voice, uncredited)
 Nackt und heiß auf Mykonos (1979) – Rennfahrer (voice)
 Die Brut des Bösen (1979) – Alberto Ramirez / Takimura (voice, uncredited)
 Gefangene Frauen (1980) – Man (voice, uncredited)
 Die Todesgöttin des Liebescamps (1981) – Tanga (voice, uncredited)
 Code Name: Wild Geese (1984) – Walter Brenner
 Macho Man (1985) – Andreas Arnold / DJ (voice, uncredited)
 The Treasure of Swamp Castle (1985) – (German version, voice)
 Astérix et le coup du menhir (1989) – Zenturio (German version, voice)
 Langer Samstag (1992)
 Pepolino and the Treasure of the Mermaid (1996) – Captain Babaluk (voice)
 Till Eulenspiegel (2003) – Stadtwache und Conferencier (voice)
 Ritter Rost – Eisenhart und voll verbeult (2013) – König Bleifuß der Verbogene (voice)

Television animation 
Saber Rider and the Star Sheriffs (Nemesis (Peter Cullen))
Sonic X (Doctor Eggman (Chikao Ōtsuka))
 Count Duckula (Nanny (Brian Trueman))

Theatrical animation 
Asterix and Cleopatra (Pyradonis (Bernard Lavalette))
Asterix and the Big Fight (Zenturio (Roger Lumont))
Asterix Conquers America (Zenturio)
Asterix in Britain (Motus (Nicolas Silberg))
Cars (Mack (John Ratzenberger))
The Incredibles (The Underminer (John Ratzenberger))
The Little Mermaid (Scuttle (Buddy Hackett), 1998 dub)
Perfect Blue (Cham manager)
Ratatouille (Mustafa (John Ratzenberger))
Toy Story (Mister Potato Head (Don Rickles))
Toy Story 2 (Mister Potato Head (Don Rickles))
The Twelve Tasks of Asterix (Zenturio (Jacques Hilling))

Video games 
Sonic the Hedgehog series (2011–2017) (Dr. Eggman)

Dubbing roles 
Harry Potter film series (Rubeus Hagrid (Robbie Coltrane))
The Santa Clause 2 (Tooth Fairy (Art LaFleur))
The Santa Clause 3: The Escape Clause (Tooth Fairy (Art LaFleur))
The Texas Chainsaw Massacre (Sheriff Hoyt (R. Lee Ermey))

References

External links 
Hartmut Neugebauer at the German Dubbing Card Index
Horspiele

1942 births
2017 deaths
German male television actors
German male voice actors
German voice directors
People from Sieraków